Jack Beaumont (born 12 September 1994) is a Scottish professional footballer, who played for Livingston and Cowdenbeath.

Career
Beaumont was a youth player at Hutchison Vale Boys Club, before joining Livingston at youth level in 2010. A member of Livingston's under 19 squad, Beaumont was promoted to the first-team on 29 October 2011, where he was an unused substitute in their win over Queen of the South. He was an unused substitute on one further occasion, before making his debut aged 17, as a substitute on 10 April 2012 in a 3–0 win over Raith Rovers. His next appearance came the following season on 4 August 2012 as a substitute in an 8–0 demolition of Stranraer in the Scottish League Cup.

In June 2015 after five years with Livingston, Beaumont moved to Scottish League One side Cowdenbeath. He signed for East Superleague club Linlithgow Rose in July 2016, but was released by Linlithgow after just 12 months.

Beaumont signed for Gala Fairydean in 2021.

Career statistics

References

External links
 

1994 births
Living people
Footballers from Edinburgh
Scottish footballers
Association football midfielders
Lothian Thistle Hutchison Vale F.C. players
Livingston F.C. players
Cowdenbeath F.C. players
Linlithgow Rose F.C. players
Pumpherston Juniors F.C. players
Tynecastle F.C. players
Gala Fairydean Rovers F.C. players
Scottish Football League players
Scottish Professional Football League players
Scottish Junior Football Association players